Donai is a civil parish in the municipality of Bragança, Portugal. The population in 2011 was 446, in an area of 15.07 km².

References

Parishes of Bragança, Portugal